Edson Coelho Araújo (born 30 July 1949), better known as Edinho Araújo, is a Brazilian politician. He is the current mayor of São José do Rio Preto, and in the past represented São Paulo as a federal deputy representative from 1995 to 2001 and from 2011 to 2017, as well as serving in the state legislature and as mayor of Santa Fé do Sul from 1977 to 1983.

Personal life
Araújo is the son of Emídio Antonio Araújo and Gabriela Coelho Araújo. He is married to Maria Elza and has three children: Thaysa, Bethina and Edson, and a granddaughter, Maria Victoria. Araújo is a practicing Presbyterian.

Political career
Araújo voted in favor of the impeachment motion of then-president Dilma Rousseff. Araújo voted in favor of tax reform spending and the 2017 Brazilian labor reform.

In May 2018 Araújo was ordered to testify by the courts as part of operation Skala conducted into reports of corruption between politicians of the MDB party, including then-president Michel Temer, and the company Rodrimar. Police eventually said they found no evidence of direct involvement by the politicians, although their public perception was hurt.

In 2018 Araújo ran for and was elected to the position of mayor for the municipality of São José do Rio Preto.

References

1949 births
Living people
People from São José do Rio Preto
Brazilian Presbyterians
Brazilian Democratic Movement politicians
Progressistas politicians
Members of the Chamber of Deputies (Brazil) from São Paulo
Members of the Legislative Assembly of São Paulo
Mayors of places in Brazil
Government ministers of Brazil